For the Winter Olympics, there are 36 venues that have been or will be used for Nordic combined. With the sport being a combination of cross-country skiing and ski jumping, the sport shares its venues with the other two sports. It is one of the sports that have been at every Winter Olympics.

References

Venues
 
Nordic combined